Md Yousuf (died 17 February 2018) was a Bangladesh Awami League politician. He served as a Jatiya Sangsad member from the Chittagong-7 constituency representing the Communist Party of Bangladesh. He later joined Awami League.

Personal life
Yousuf was a confirmed bachelor.

References

1940s births
2018 deaths
People from Chittagong District
Awami League politicians
Year of birth missing
Place of birth missing